Tampa Bay United Soccer Club is a soccer club from Tampa, Florida that plays in the Southeast Division in USL League Two.

History
The club was founded as a youth soccer club in Tampa, Florida, where they are the largest youth team in the city.

In 2017, they formed a partnership with professional club Tampa Bay Rowdies, who play in the second-tier USL Championship. As part of the affiliation, TBU rebranded as the Tampa Bay United Rowdies, adopting the Rowdies' green and gold hooped jerseys and wearing the Rowdies logo on their jerseys on their jerseys. As part of the partnership, they became the Rowdies official youth affiliate program.

In 2020, it was announced that they were joining the MLS Next youth development program for academy teams in the United States and Canada. In 2021, it was announced that the club was rejoining the Women's Premier Soccer League where they originally had a team known as the Tampa Bay Hellenic, which rebranded to the Tampa Bay United name in 2017, before departing the league in 2018.

In 2021, they joined USL League Two, the fourth tier of the U.S. soccer pyramid, replacing the Tampa Bay Rowdies U23 who had initially been set to rejoin the league in 2020, prior to that season's cancelation.

Year-by-year

References

USL League Two teams
Soccer clubs in Florida
Tampa Bay Rowdies
Soccer clubs in Tampa, Florida